The Henty Gold Mine is located at the head of the Henty River on the edge of the West Coast Range in Western Tasmania. It is approximately 30 km north of Queenstown. It is east of Zeehan and south of Rosebery. It can be reached by the Hydro-built road that passes between the Henty River and Tullah.

History
Operations began in the 1990s. Its orebody and viability was ascertained from earlier exploration in the area during the 1970s when the priority was for other forms of mineralization within the Mount Read Volcanic Belt.

Henty lies within the mineral rich Mt. Read Volcanic Belt in Western Tasmania that hosts the Hellyer, Que River, Rosebery, Hercules and Mount Lyell base metal deposits. The eastern side of the belt is dominated by the Henty Fault which runs north-east for over 60 kilometres between Mount Charter and Mount Read. The Henty operation is based on a series of structurally complex high-grade zones of gold mineralisation that occur within a package of highly altered volcanic rock adjacent to the Henty Fault.

The Henty Gold Mine was operated by Barrick Gold – currently the largest gold producing company in the world, which acquired the mine through the takeover of Placer Dome in 2006. The Henty mine was expected to close on or before November 2009, with subsequent rehabilitation, due to depletion of ore reserves.

Henty Gold was acquired by Bendigo Mining mid-2009. Bendigo specialise in small scale operations and expect to extend the mine's life and also own the Kangaroo Flat Mine at Bendigo. The mine continued to operate under Bendigo, producing 43,178 ounces of gold in the 2009–10 financial year, after investing A$3.8 million into mining equipment for the mine.
At stages of the mine's history, environmental monitoring studies were conducted on adjacent waterways.

The Henty Gold Mine has produced about 1.3 million ounces of gold over a 16-year mine life.

Death of mine worker 
On 23 January 2020 a mine worker was missing underground following a fall of ground at the mine. By the next day, it was reported as unlikely that he could have survived due to the amount of rock which had fallen. The mine was still unstable so only drones had been able to explore the rockfall. On 25 January, mining services company Pybar Mining Services stated "following a site visit yesterday afternoon by the Tasmanian State Coroner and Tasmanian Police, it is with sadness that we acknowledge that the most likely outcome of our missing work colleague is that he is deceased." Police also confirmed the presumed death of 44-year-old Cameron John Goss in a statement released to media.

Production
Past production figures of the mine were:

See also
 West Coast Tasmania Mines

References

Gold mines in Tasmania
Underground mines in Australia
Barrick Gold
West Coast Range